Fairville may refer to the following places:

 Fairville, New Brunswick, Canada

United States 
 Fairville, California, a place in California
 Fairville, Iowa
 Fairville, Louisiana, in St. Mary Parish
 Fairville, Missouri
 Fairville, New York
 Fairville, Pennsylvania